Amasis, King of Egypt is a 1738 tragedy by the British writer Charles Marsh.

References

Bibliography
 Nicoll, Allardyce. A History of Early Eighteenth Century Drama: 1700-1750. CUP Archive, 1927.

1738 plays
British plays
Tragedy plays
West End plays